Mika X (also known as Mika Haka) is a New Zealand Maori actor, producer, executive producer, and a music artist. Mika began his acting career in the 1980s in performing arts theatre before landing his first television role on Shark in the Park under his birth name Neil Gudsell. Mika had his first film role on The Rogue Stallion in his small role as Constable. Mika went on to producing and executive producing his on TV show including Mika Live and Te Mika Show. The largest short film him he has created was GURL which went on to win an award at the New Zealand International Film Festival.

Film

Short Film

Television

Documentary

Theatre

Music Video

"I Have Loved Me A Man", Mika Haka, (1990)
"A.E.I.O.U.", Moana and the Moahunters (1991)
"Lava Lover", Mika Haka, (1991)
"Geraldine", Jan Hellriegel (1995)
"Do U like What U See", Mika Haka, (1996)
"Taniwha", Mika Haka, (1999)
"My Angel", Mika Haka, (2000)
"Ahi Ataahua", Mika Haka, (2001)
"Wera Wera", Mika Haka, (2001)
"Poti", Mika & Te Plastic Maori, (2007)
"Taniwha Live", Mika Haka, (2011)
"Dress To Express", Mika Haka ft. Hannah Martin & Zakk d'Larté, (2014)
"Coffee", Mika Haka ft. Lavina Williams, (2014)
"Loved Me A Man", Mika Haka ft. Lavina Williams, (2016)

References

External links
 Official IMDB

Male actor filmographies